This is a list of former TV channels in the United Kingdom.

EPG numbers are displayed in the columns to the left under the relevant service names.

Analogue

Digital

Year

2000

2001

2002

2003

2004

2005

2006

2007

2008

2009

2010

2011

2012

2013

2014

2015

2016

2017

2018

2019

2020

2021

2022

2023

See also 
 Television in the United Kingdom

References

Lists of British television channels
 
Television channels and stations by year of disestablishment